Lane v. Wilson, 307 U.S. 268 (1939), was a United States Supreme Court case that found a 12-day one-time voter registration window to be discriminatory for black citizens and repugnant to the Fifteenth Amendment.

Background
In 1915, the Supreme Court of the United States held in Guinn v. United States that a grandfather clause to Oklahoma's literacy test for voting was unconstitutional, violating the Fifteenth Amendment. In response, the Oklahoma legislature passed a law giving citizens of the state a 12-day period, from April 30 to May 11, 1916, in which they were allowed to register to vote. Individuals who missed that registration period would be barred permanently from voting. But, a grandfather clause exempting citizens who had voted in 1914, that is, before Guinn, largely exempted white voters from the provisions of the narrow registration window. In practice the registration period worked against black citizens.

I. W. Lane, a black citizen of Oklahoma, was banned from voting under Oklahoma's rules, and sued for $5,000 in damages. The district court found against him, and the Tenth Circuit Court of Appeals upheld the ruling of the district court. Lane appealed to the US Supreme Court.

Decision

Justice Frankfurter delivered the ruling of the court, which held that Oklahoma's registration window and grandfather clause violated the Fifteenth Amendment to the United States Constitution.

See also
List of United States Supreme Court cases

References

External links
 
 

1939 in United States case law
Civil rights movement case law
United States Supreme Court cases
United States Supreme Court cases of the Hughes Court
United States Fifteenth Amendment case law
History of voting rights in the United States
Legal history of Oklahoma
African-American history of Oklahoma
African-American history between emancipation and the civil rights movement
Oklahoma elections
United States racial discrimination case law